The Italjet Dragster of the Italian manufacturer Italjet Moto is the only mass-produced scooter with a RAAD forkless front suspension and a spaceframe. Alessandro and Leopoldo Tartarini obtained a patent for this combination in 1997. A rebooted version has been released developed by Massimo Tartarini with the assistance of Andrea Dovizioso and comes in 125 and 200cc

Technology 
The forkless front suspension is very unusual for motorcycles, and the Yamaha GTS 1000 (1993–1997) might have been the inspiration for the Tartarini brothers. They applied a very innovative technology and an unusual design to their scooter.

All Dragster marks are based on a space frame, which was designed for more power. The wheel dimensions are 120/70–11 front and 130/70–12 rear. The 2007 models had a 130/60–13 rear wheel. The wheelbase was 1310 mm. The mark Dragster 50 was re-edited in 2007 in addition to the mark Dragster 250. The forkless front suspension was criticised as leading to "non-harmonic and wobbly dynamics at lower speeds." Some critics complained about the noise level of the large water cooled two stroke engine, which had a catalytic converter.

Marks

References 

Motor scooters